SpeedDate.com is a speed dating website started by two Stanford graduates, Simon Tisminezky and Dan Abelon after an entrepreneurship class at Stanford Business School co-taught by Eric Schmidt.

History 
Originally a Stanford University business class project, Speeddate.com combines online dating and round robin-style speed dating, where singles spend five minutes or less connecting live with potential matches.  The domain was acquired in 2007 and since its launch in late 2007, SpeedDate.com has hosted over 60 million online speed dates. Within an hour, users meet up to 15 people using live video and instant messaging.  Each date lasts three minutes, after which users can continue the conversation or chat with someone else.  SpeedDate secured U.S. Patent Number 7,203,674 covering key aspects of online speed dating.

Applications 
SpeedDate.com has applications on iPhone, iPad, Android, Facebook, MySpace, Bebo and Meebo.  Like many online dating sites, SpeedDate.com is a freemium service and its revenue comes from premium subscriptions.

Reception 
After SpeedDate secured $6 million in Series B financing from Menlo Ventures, Jason Kincaid at TechCrunch reported: "Unlike most dating sites, there was no lengthy signup process – the site leaves the real matchmaking to your video chats. And while SpeedDate seemed to totally ignore the interests and personality traits I entered anyway, the experience was still surprisingly fun. I typically only had to wait a few minutes between each session, and girls I spoke to during my “dates” told me that their general experience on the site had been quite positive."

References 

 Startup to launch online speed-dating service, NBC News.com
 Does This Webcam Make Me Look Fat?, New York Times, Oct 5 2007
  Super Tuesday Speed Dating, The Huffington Post, Feb 6 2008
 Web Scout: Spinning through online entertainment and connected culture, LA Times, Feb 12 2008
  SpeedDate is Just That. With Webcams., Mashable, Oct 29 2007
 SpeedDate Hijacks Facebook Users With A Bait And Switch, TechCrunch, September 12, 2008
 Oregon Trail Facebook app to be replaced with dating service, CNet, October 23, 2008

External links 
 SpeedDate.com
 Zawaj

Internet properties established in 2007
Online dating services of the United States
2007 establishments in California